Karise Eden (born 11 July 1992) is an Australian singer and songwriter. In 2012, she became the winner of the first series of The Voice Australia. Eden subsequently signed with Universal Music Australia and released her debut single "You Won't Let Me". It was one of the four songs recorded by Eden that entered the ARIA Singles Chart top five during the week of 25 June 2012. She became the first artist to achieve this feat since The Beatles, who held the top six positions of the chart in 1964. Eden's debut studio album My Journey was released on 26 June 2012, which contained songs she performed on The Voice, as well as newly recorded covers. The album debuted at number one on the ARIA Albums Chart and was certified double platinum.

Early life
Eden was born on 11 July 1992 in Gosford Hospital in Gosford, New South Wales. She was raised in Wyoming, New South Wales. Her mother is Michele and her sister is Siana. From a young age, Eden and her sister were part of a foster aunty and uncle program, which gave their single mother Michele respite. One weekend a month (and often more often), they would stay with 'aunty' Marilyn and 'uncle' Frank. Eden's childhood was deeply affected by her family dysfunctions and issues of self-esteem. As the years passed, she did not always get along well with her mother, and at the age of 11, she began harming herself. During this time, she was diagnosed with agoraphobia and, at the age of 12, Eden finished school. It was around this time that Eden saw a Janis Joplin documentary on television and realised that maybe the raspy tones in her own voice weren't that bad after all.  "Hence began my obsession with everything Janis".

At around the age of 13, Eden was left in the care of Department of Community Services at Gosford by her mother, who was not coping. Eden spent her teenage years living in over 20 women's refuges as a state ward.  During this time, she reconnected with Aunty Marilyn and Uncle Frank who were both musicians. She recalled that her uncle Frank taught her everything about music and how to play the guitar. "When he first started teaching me how to play, I was playing traditional folk and bluegrass – now I play the double bass and I'm learning the banjo".

Career

2012: The Voice Australia and My Journey 

Eden auditioned for the first series of the Australian reality television talent show The Voice. She appeared on the show's first episode on 15 April 2012, singing James Brown's "It's a Man's World". All four coaches turned around their chairs within the first twelve seconds: Keith Urban was the first coach who turned around his chair, followed by the other three coaches: Seal, Delta Goodrem and Joel Madden. All four coaches opted to take Eden as one of their finalists; she eventually chose Seal as her coach and mentor. Eden progressed through to the Battle Rounds, where she was paired against contestant Paula Parore, singing Amy Winehouse's "Back to Black". As a result, Seal chose Eden as the winner of the battle and she progressed through to the Live Shows. Throughout this round, the coaches and audiences were impressed with Eden's performances of Rebecca Ferguson's "Nothing's Real but Love", Fleetwood Mac's "Landslide" and Leonard Cohen's "Hallelujah".

During the first part of the grand final, on 17 June 2012, Eden sang an original song entitled "I Was Your Girl", which she co-wrote with a friend, and a cover of Lorraine Ellison's "Stay with Me Baby". Eden was announced the winner of the season during the second part of the grand final on 18 June 2012. After she was announced the winner, Eden performed her debut single "You Won't Let Me" for the first time. She was awarded a prize of $100,000, a Ford Focus car and a recording contract with Universal Music Australia.

Performances

"You Won't Let Me" was released digitally on 19 June 2012 and physically on 21 June 2012. For the week of 25 June 2012, Eden's songs "You Won't Let Me", "Stay with Me Baby", "Hallelujah" and "I Was Your Girl" took up four positions of the ARIA Singles Chart top five. She became the first artist to achieve this feat since The Beatles, who held the top six positions of the chart in 1964. Eden had a total of eight songs in the ARIA top 50 for that week. Six of these songs left the ARIA top 50 the following week, including "Stay with Me Baby" which dropped to number 54, the biggest drop from number one in Australian chart history. "I Was Your Girl" left the ARIA top 100, the equal biggest fall for a number three song in Australian chart history. "You Won't Let Me", "I Was Your Girl", "Nothing's Real but Love" and "Stay with Me Baby" each received gold certifications by the Australian Recording Industry Association (ARIA), for sales of 35,000 copies. "Hallelujah" was certified platinum for sales of 70,000 copies.

Eden's debut studio album My Journey was released on 26 June 2012. The album features recorded versions of the covers Eden performed on The Voice, the original song "I Was Your Girl", as well as newly recorded covers of "The Weight", "Hound Dog", "Move Over", "I'd Rather Go Blind" and "The Dock of the Bay". The album debuted at number one on the ARIA Albums Chart, where it remained for six consecutive weeks. It was certified double platinum by the ARIA, denoting sales of 140,000 copies. The album also debuted at number three on the New Zealand Albums Chart and was certified gold by the Recording Industry Association of New Zealand (RIANZ), denoting sales of 7,500 copies. Eden promoted the album with instore appearances at Westfield shopping centres across Australia. In October 2012, she embarked on the Heavenly Sounds national tour of churches and cathedral venues.

2013–2017: Things I've Done
In March 2013, Eden was part of the Bluesfest along with many other local and international acts in Byron Bay, New South Wales. Eden's second single "Threads of Silence", co-written with Sacha Skarbek in London, was released digitally on 3 June 2013, the same day she performed it live on The Voice. Upon its release, the song debuted and peaked at number 19 on the ARIA Singles Chart. "Dynamite" was released as the lead single from Eden's second studio album, Things I've Done, on 12 September 2014, and peaked at number 65. The album was released on 17 October 2014, and debuted at number five on the ARIA Albums Chart. The album's second single "Loneliness" was released on 3 April 2015, but failed to chart. On 2 June 2015, Eden released a cover version of The Shirelles song "Will You Still Love Me Tomorrow", which was used in a promotional sync campaign for the Nine Network's drama series Love Child.

2018–2021: Born to Fight
In October 2018, Eden announced the release of her third studio album titled Born to Fight. Eden realized she wanted to make music that showed her fiery side, her passion for blues, rock'n roll and even power ballads, saying "I've always been singing sad soul songs and I thought, just for once, there's another side of my personality that's never been shown on camera, my off-screen sass and who I am as a person, and that's a lot of what poured into this album." The album's lead single, "Temporary Lovers," was released on 19 October 2018. The full album was released on 23 November 2018.

2022: Into the Black
In January 2022, Eden announced the forthcoming released of her fourth studio album, titled, Into the Black.

Artistry
Aside from singing, Eden also plays the banjo, double bass and guitar. She cites Janis Joplin, Axl Rose, Bon Jovi and Amy Winehouse as her musical inspirations.

Personal life
On 8 September 2014, Eden announced that she was expecting her first child. She gave birth to a son named Blayden on 24 December 2014.
In January 2018, Eden was hospitalised after being involved in a motor cycle accident.

Discography

Studio albums

Singles

Promotional singles

Album appearances

Music videos

Awards and nominations

References

External links

1992 births
Living people
Australian blues singers
Australian singer-songwriters
Australian soul singers
People from Gosford
The Voice (Australian TV series) contestants
The Voice (franchise) winners
Universal Music Group artists
Eden, Karise
21st-century Australian women singers
21st-century Australian singers
Australian women singer-songwriters